Menudo, also known as ginamay or ginagmay (Cebuano: "[chopped into] smaller pieces"), is a traditional stew from the Philippines made with pork and sliced liver in tomato sauce with carrots and potatoes. Unlike the Mexican dish of the same name, it does not use tripe or red chili sauce.

Description
The dish is made with garlic, onions, tomatoes, pork, liver (pork or beef), diced potatoes, raisins, diced carrots, green bell peppers, soy sauce, vinegar or calamansi, and tomato sauce, and seasoned with salt and pepper.

It is one of the most common offerings in carinderias or karinderyas (small eateries that offer budget-friendly meals to local residents) and is also commonly served in potlucks or buffets due to the inexpensive ingredients used in the dish.

Waknatoy

Waknatoy, also called Marikina menudo, is a Filipino pork stew with pickles. It is a variant of the Filipino menudo stew originating from Marikina. It is made with cubed pork and pork liver with sausages (typically Chorizo de Bilbao), red and green bell peppers, tomatoes, garlic, onions, and distinctively, pickle relish, cooked in a tomato-based sauce with salt, pepper, fish sauce, and bay leaves. Waknatoy does not traditionally include other vegetables like potatoes and carrots, like menudo, but they can be included.

See also
 Afritada
 Everlasting
 List of pork dishes
 List of stews
 Mechado

References

Philippine cuisine
Pork dishes
Meat stews
Tomato dishes
Offal dishes
Sausage dishes
Pickles
Potato dishes